Péter Zsolt Róna (born 4 May 1942) is a Hungarian economist and lawyer. He has been fellow of Blackfriars Hall of the University of Oxford since 2009, where he lectures on the philosophical foundations of the social sciences. Róna was the nominee of the United for Hungary political alliance in the 2022 Hungarian presidential election.

References

External links

1942 births
Living people
People from Miskolc
Hungarian economists
20th-century Hungarian lawyers
Hungarian academics
Hungarian Roman Catholics
Fellows of Blackfriars, Oxford
University of Pennsylvania alumni
Alumni of the University of Oxford
Hungarian emigrants to the United States
Candidates for President of Hungary